Ofer Shitrit (born 12 July 1970) is a retired Israeli footballer and currently an active beach footballer.

Honours
Israel State Cup (1):
1995

External links
Profile at One

1970 births
Living people
Israeli Jews
Israeli footballers
Hapoel Lod F.C. players
Hapoel Kfar Saba F.C. players
Hapoel Ramat Gan F.C. players
Maccabi Ironi Ashdod F.C. players
Maccabi Herzliya F.C. players
Maccabi Haifa F.C. players
Maccabi Petah Tikva F.C. players
Hapoel Tel Aviv F.C. players
Beitar Jerusalem F.C. players
Hapoel Haifa F.C. players
Maccabi Netanya F.C. players
Bnei Yehuda Tel Aviv F.C. players
F.C. Ashdod players
Maccabi Kafr Kanna F.C. players
Hapoel Bnei Lod F.C. players
Beitar Tel Aviv Bat Yam F.C. players
Hapoel Rishon LeZion F.C. players
Israel international footballers
Footballers from Lod
Liga Leumit players
Israeli Premier League players
Israeli people of Moroccan-Jewish descent
Association football forwards